Mohamed Herit (born 16 April 1937) is an Egyptian weightlifter. He competed at the 1964 Summer Olympics and the 1968 Summer Olympics.

References

1937 births
Living people
Egyptian male weightlifters
Olympic weightlifters of Egypt
Weightlifters at the 1964 Summer Olympics
Weightlifters at the 1968 Summer Olympics
Sportspeople from Cairo
20th-century Egyptian people